Tjandamurra may refer to:

Tjandamurra O'Shane (born 1990) - An Indigenous Australian who was the victim of a fire attack in 1996.
Jandamarra (c. 1873 - 1897) - An Indigenous Australian warrior who led armed insurrections in the 19th century.